Camilla Norderud (born 1984), better known under her stage name Camilla North, is a Norwegian singer, songwriter and model. She wrote the song "Deja Vu," which is found on 4 Walls, an album by Korean girl band f(x) which reached number 1 on the World Billboard list.

She grew up in her hometown of Bergen, and she studied music at Langhaugen upper secondary school. She obtained her Bachelor Degree in music and an MA in songwriting at Bath Spa University in England.

North competed in the "English Live & Unsigned competition" and came among the top 8 out of 40,000 in her category. She won the" Battle of the Vox" in the United Kingdom in 2008, and she won the "Norwegian songwriting competition iLod" in 2009.

Her singles "Just Breathe," "Unloveable," and "Notice Me" were released in 2016. She co-wrote "Deja Vu" for the "4 Walls" album of the Korean girl band f(x), which was number 1 on the World Billboard list. Norderud attempted to represent San Marino at the 2018 Eurovision Song Contest.

References

External links 
 Homepage of Camilla North
 Seiler opp som favoritt blant 10.000 talenter
 Camilla Norderud
 Camilla North: “I’ve always had a dream about performing on the big Eurovision stage”
 Finalist Camilla North

Living people
1984 births
Norwegian songwriters
21st-century Norwegian singers
21st-century Norwegian women singers
Alumni of Bath Spa University